This is a list of cricketers who have played first-class, List A or Twenty20 cricket for Indian state of Haryana.

Male cricketers
Male cricketers who have played for the Haryana cricket team.

 Vivek Agarwal (3/1/1962 – 26/4/1993)
 Rajinder Amarnath (30/6/1956 – )
 Desh Azad (2/2/1938 – 16/8/2013)
 Hemang Badani (14/11/1976 – )
 Avi Barot (25/6/1992 – )
 Chaitanya Bishnoi (25/8/1994 – )
 Manvinder Bisla (27/12/1984 – )
 Sanjay Budhwar (8/10/1987 – )
 Ravinder Chadha (16/3/1951 – )
 Ajit Chahal (12/12/1995 – )
 Yuzvendra Chahal (23/7/1990 – )
 Ajit Chandila (5/12/1983 – )
 Shivam Chauhan (14/10/1997 – )
 Mukul Dagar (17/12/1990 – )
 Rahul Dagar (4/7/1993 – )
 Virender Dahiya (7/2/1989 – )
 Rahul Dalal (2/2/1992 – )
 Kapil Dev (6/1/1959 – )
 Rahul Dewan (15/7/1986 – )
 Rahul Vashisth(28/03/1989-)
 Feroze Ghayas (3/5/1973 – )
 Rajinder Goel (20/9/1942 – )
 Ranjan Gupta (11/12/1980 – )
 Ashish Hooda (20/9/1989 – )
 Kuldeep Hooda (15/11/1989 – )
 Mohit Hooda (19/8/1998 – )
 Ajay Jadeja (1/2/1971 – )
 Pradeep Jain (22/5/1965 – )
 Vineet Jain (16/5/1972 – )
 Sandeep Joshi (2/9/1967 – )
 Saad Bin Jung (26/10/1960 – )
 Amarjit Kaypee (2/10/1960 – )
 Ashok Malhotra ( – )
 Poonish Mehta (4/11/1993 – )
 Amit Mishra (24/11/1982 – )
 Sumit Narwal (1982 – )
 Narender Negi (12/2/1978 – )
 Pratyaksh Singh (22/03/2018 – )
 Rajinder Pal (18/11/1937 – )
 Harshal Patel (23/11/1990 – )
 Amit Rana (14/12/1995 – )
 Himanshu Rana (1/10/1998 – )
 Sachin Rana
 Ajay Ratra (13/12/1981 – )
 Mahesh Rawat (25/10/1985 – )
 Shubham Rohilla (10/3/1998 – )
 Pardeep Sahu (21/8/1985 – )
 Nitin Saini (28/10/1988 – )
 Ashok Sandhu (11/10/2000 – )
 sanjay pahal (07/02/2018 – )
 Chetan Sharma (3/1/1966 – )
 Deepak Sharma (11/2/1960 – )
 Joginder Sharma (23/10/1983 – )
 Mohit Sharma (18/9/1988 – )
 Rohit Sharma (28/6/1993 – )
 Narinder Singh (4/7/1954 – )
 Sandeep Singh (10/10/1988 – 6/2/2014)
 Sunny Singh (18/12/1986 – )
 Yograj Singh (25/3/1958 – )
 Arun Singla (8/6/1970 – )
 Vidyut Sivaramakrishnan (3/12/1981 – )
 Sarkar Talwar (22/9/1952 – )
 Priyank Tehlan (11/9/1988 – )
 Rahul Tewatia (20/5/1993 – )
 Siddharth Verma (20/11/1980 – )
 Kanwar Virdi (11/2/1969 – )
 Jayant Yadav (22/1/1990 – )
 Shamsher Yadav (12/12/1994 – )
 Vijay Yadav (14/3/1967 – )
 Dhanraj Singh (cricketer) (01/06/1968 – )

Female cricketers
Female cricketers who have played for the Haryana women's cricket team.

 Preeti Bose (20/4/1992 – )
 Mansi Joshi (6/11/1991 – )

References

Haryana cricketers

cricketers